Ion T. Costin (19 January 1887, Ghidighici - 12 January 1940, Bucharest) was a Moldovan politician.

Biography 
He served as Director General for Internal Affairs in Pantelimon Erhan Cabinet and Daniel Ciugureanu Cabinet, then worked as a lawyer in Tulcea. He served also as deputy mayor and then Mayor of Chişinău (1933—1937), director of Sfatul Țării (newspaper) and Dreptatea.

Gallery

External links 
 „Viaţa Noastră” - ziarul care a salvat viaţa unui deputat în Sfatul Ţării
 COSTIN, ION T.
 SIMPOZIONUL INTERNAŢIONAL „ION COSTIN - NUME NOTORIU ÎN ISTORIA ŢĂRII. 70 DE ANI DE LA TRECEREA ÎN NEMURIRE”

Notes

1887 births
1940 deaths
People from Kishinyovsky Uyezd
Moldovan Ministers of the Interior
Moldovan MPs 1917–1918
Mayors of Chișinău
Moldovan jurists
Moldovan journalists
Male journalists
20th-century journalists